Bala Mahalleh-ye Qasemabad (also Romanized as Bālā Maḩalleh-ye Qāsemābād; also known as Qāsemābād, Qāsemābād-e Bālā, Qāsemābād-e ‘Olyā, and Qasemābād ‘Olyā) is a village in Owshiyan Rural District, Chaboksar District, Rudsar County, Gilan Province, Iran. At the 2006 census, its population was 917, in 274 families.

References 

Populated places in Rudsar County